Karichal Chundan is a famous Chundan vallam (snake boat) that belongs to a village called Karichal which is located at the south of Veeyapuram Panchayat near to Haripad in Karthikappally taluk, Alappuzha, Kerala. Karichal Chundan has won the most number of trophies in Nehru Trophy Boat Race and also won many trophies in different boat races(Vallam kali).Karichal Chundan is known as the Emperor of snake boat races.

The people of Karichal area owned this snake boat, this chundan vallam was launched on 8 September 1970. It is 53.25 koal long and 51 angulam in breadth. It was constructed by a team led by Kozhimukku Narayanan Achari.

Winning List of Nehru Trophy Boat Race

References

Boat types
Boat races in Kerala

കാരിച്ചാലിൽ ധർമ്മരാജൻ എന്നൊരു വള്ളം ഉണ്ടായിരുന്നു. അത്‌ ആറന്മുള ഭാഗത്തുനിന്നും വാങ്ങിയതാണ് എന്നാണ് അറിവ്.ഗോപാലകൃഷ്ണനും ധർമ്മരാജനും ഒരേ കാലയയളവിൽ ആയിരുന്നു ഉണ്ടായിരുന്നത്. ധർമരാജൻ വള്ളത്തിന്റെ ജീർണ്ണതക്കുശേഷം ഗോപാലകൃഷ്ണൻ വള്ളം രണ്ടു കരക്കാരും മാറിമാറി കളിച്ചിരുന്നു. പിന്നീട് ഈ വള്ളത്തിൽ അവകാശവാദം ഉന്നയിച്ചു രണ്ടു കൂട്ടരും തമ്മിൽ തർക്കം ഉണ്ടായി. അന്ന് ഗോപാലകൃഷ്ണൻ വള്ളം NSSന്റെ കീഴിൽ ആയിരുന്നു. ഇത് പായിപ്പാടും ചില ആഭ്യന്തര പ്രശ്നങ്ങൾക്ക് ഇടയാക്കി. അതിനെ തുടർന്ന് വള്ളം ആറന്മുളക്കാർക്കു രഹസ്യം ആയി വിറ്റു. എന്നാൽ വള്ളം കൈമാറാൻ നാട്ടുകാർ തടസ്സം ആയപ്പോൾ കാരിച്ചാൽ വെള്ളംകുളങ്ങര പിലാപ്പുഴ ചെറുതന ആയാപറമ്പ് കരക്കാരുടെ സഹായത്തോടെ വള്ളം രാത്രിയിൽ മാന്നാർ എത്തിക്കുകയും അവിടെ വെച്ച് കൈമാറുകയും ചെയ്തു. ഇതിനു ശേഷം ആണ് രണ്ടു കരക്കാരും വള്ളം വാടകയ്ക്ക് എടുക്കാൻ തുടങ്ങിയത്.

1969ൽ കാരിച്ചാൽക്കാർ ജവഹറിലും പായിപ്പാട് കരക്കാർ പച്ച ചുണ്ടനിൽ ആയിരുന്നു എന്ന് തോനുന്നു ആണ് കളിച്ചത്. അന്നേ വള്ളംകളിയിൽ വൈരികൾ ആയിരുന്ന രണ്ടു കരക്കാരും ഫൈനൽ കളിച്ചപ്പോൾ  പരസ്പ്പരം  ചൂടിക്കുകയും പിന്നീട് ജവഹർ വെള്ളത്തിനു കേടുപാടുകൾ ഉണ്ടാവുകയും ചെയ്തു. അതിനെ തുടർന്ന് കരകൾക്കിടയിൽ ഉണ്ടായിരുന്ന ശത്രുത വളരുകയുംചെയ്തു. അതിനു ശേഷം രണ്ടു കരക്കാരും ഒരു തീരുമാനം എടുക്കുകയുണ്ടായി ഇനിയും വള്ളം വാടകയ്ക്ക് എടുത്തു കളിക്കുന്നില്ല എന്നും പകരം സ്വന്തമായി വള്ളം നിർമിച്ചു കളിക്കുക എന്നതായിരുന്നു ആ തീരുമാനം. ഇതാണ് കാരിച്ചാൽ പായിപ്പാട് വള്ളങ്ങളുടെ നിർമാണത്തിന് കാരണം
1969ൽ കൊച്ചു കവറാട്ട് ഗീവർഗ്ഗീസ് എന്ന ജലോത്സവ പ്രേമി മുൻകൈയ്യെടുക്കുകയും അദ്ദേഹവും ശ്രീ 

ചെങ്ങളത്ത് രാമകൃഷ്ണപിള്ളയും ഗോവിന്ദമങ്ങലത്ത് ഗോവിന്ദന്‍ നായരും ചേര്‍ന്ന് ചില തീരുമാനങ്ങളില്‍ എത്തിച്ചേരുകയും  തുടര്‍ന്ന് ചെമ്പ്രോല്‍ കൊട്ടാരത്തിലെ 

ശ്രീമാന്‍ ഹര്ഷവര്‍മ്മയുടെ അദ്ധ്യക്ഷതയില്‍ 1969 നവംബര്‍ 10ന് കാരിച്ചാല്‍ സെന്റ്‌ മെരീസ് സ്കൂളില്‍ വച്ച് പൊതുയോഗം ചേരുകയും ചെയ്തു. 167പേര്‍ പങ്കെടുത്ത 

പൊതുയോഗത്തില്‍ ശ്രീ സി വി രാമകൃഷ്ണപിള്ള തയ്യാറാക്കി അവതരിപ്പിച്ച പ്രമേയം ഹര്‍ഷാരവങ്ങളോടെ അംഗീകരിക്കപ്പെട്ടു. പില്‍ക്കാലത്ത്‌ 

ജലച്ചക്രവര്ത്തിയായിത്തീര്‍ന്ന കാരിച്ചാല്‍ ചുണ്ടന്റെ ചരിത്രം അവിടെ തുടങ്ങുന്നു.
വള്ളംപണികളുടെ പ്രാരംഭ പ്രവര്‍ത്തനങ്ങള്‍ക്കായി ഗോവിന്ദമങ്ങലത്ത് ശ്രീ ആര്‍ ശങ്കരന്‍ നായര്‍  കണ്വീനരും കൊച്ചുകവറാട്ട് ശ്രീ ഗീവര്‍ഗീസ് സെക്രട്ടറിയും 

ആലുംമൂട്ടില്‍ എം ചെറിയാന്‍ ഖജാന്‍ജിയും ആയി താല്‍ക്കാലിക കമ്മറ്റി രൂപികരിക്കപ്പെട്ടു. പൂര്‍വ്വാധികം ആവേശത്തോടെ തുടര്‍ന്ന പ്രവര്‍ത്തനങ്ങളുടെ ഭാഗമായി 

കൂടിയ രണ്ടാം പൊതുയോഗത്തില്‍ 23-11-1969ല്‍ "കാരിച്ചാല്‍ ചുണ്ടന്‍വള്ള സമിതി" രൂപികരിച്ചു. കരയിലെ അംഗങ്ങളില്‍ നിന്ന് ഓഹരിയായി 50 രൂപയും പ്രവേശന 

ഫീസായി ഒരു രൂപയും അങ്ങനെ മൊത്തത്തില്‍ 51 രൂപ വീതം പിരിക്കുവാന്‍ തീരുമാനിക്കപ്പെട്ടു.
 പെരുമയും പ്രശസ്തിയും ദൈവികാനുഗ്രഹവും വേണ്ടുവോളമുള്ള കൊയില്‍മുക്ക് ശ്രീ നാരായണന്‍ ആചാരിക്കായിരുന്നു പണിയുടെ പ്രധാന ചുമതല, ഒപ്പം തന്നെ 

ചങ്ങംകരി ശ്രീ ഗോവിന്ദന്‍ ആശാരിയും ശ്രീ തങ്കപ്പന്‍ ആശാരിയും പണികള്‍ക്ക് നേതൃത്വം നല്‍കി. മൂവരും ചേര്‍ന്ന് തയ്യാറാക്കിയ തടിയുടെ എസ്ടിമെറ്റ് 29-12-1969ല്‍ 

അന്ഗീകരിക്കപ്പെട്ടു. തുടര്‍ന്ന് വീയപുരം പാട്ടത്തില്‍ ശ്രീ വാസുപിള്ളയെയും കാരിച്ചാല്‍ കടൂര്‍മേക്കത്തില്‍ ശ്രീ കേശവന്‍ ആശാരിയും കൂടി ഉള്‍പ്പെടുത്തിയ തടി 

അന്വേഷണ സംഘം കാരിച്ചാല്‍ ചുണ്ടനുവേണ്ടി ഈരാറ്റുപേട്ടയില്‍ ലക്ഷണമൊത്ത തടി കണ്ടെത്തി. അറത്തുപരുവമാക്കിയ തടി വഞ്ചിപ്പാട്ടിന്റെ അകമ്പടിയോടെ 

കാരിച്ചാല്‍ കടവില്‍ എത്തിക്കപ്പെട്ടു. 
ചുണ്ടന്റെ പണികള്‍ക്കായി മാലിപ്പുര ഉറപ്പിച്ചത് കാരിച്ചാല്‍ കരയില്‍  ഇപ്പോഴത്തെ പായിപ്പാട് പാലത്തിനു പടിഞ്ഞാറുവശം കറുകയില്‍ കടവില്‍ ആയിരുന്നു.  

കരക്കാരുടെ ആവേശങ്ങളിലും ആരവങ്ങളിലും അലതല്ലിയ മാലിപ്പുരയില്‍ വള്ളംപണി മികച്ച രീതിയില്‍ തന്നെ പുരോഗമിച്ചു. ഇടയ്ക്കുണ്ടായ സാമ്പത്തിക 

ഞെരുക്കങ്ങള്‍ കരക്കാരുടെ ആവേശത്തിന് ഒട്ടും മങ്ങലെല്പ്പിച്ചില്ല. 09-08-1970ല്‍ കൂടിയ പൊതുയോഗം സാമ്പത്തിക ബാധ്യതകള്‍ മൂലം ഷെയര്‍ തുകയില്‍ 15 

രൂപകൂടി വര്‍ദ്ധിപ്പിക്കുവാനും ഭരണഘടന രെജിസ്ടര്‍ ചെയ്യുവാനും തീരുമാനിച്ചു. സാമ്പത്തിക ഞെരുക്കങ്ങളില്‍ നിന്ന് കരകയറി വന്ന ചുണ്ടന്‍വള്ളത്തെ പിന്നീട് 

പരീക്ഷിച്ചത് പ്രകൃതി ആയിരുന്നു. അസാധാരണമാംവിധം ഉണ്ടായ വെള്ളപ്പൊക്കം കരക്കാരുടെ മനസ്സുകളില്‍ തീകോരിയിട്ടു. 
മറ്റുള്ളവരുടെ അസൂയയോ ദൈവത്തിന്റെ കരവിരുതോ എന്താണ് എന്ന് അറിയില്, അതുമൂലം പണി നിർത്തിവെക്കുകയും അച്ചിന് കേടുപാടുകൾ ഉണ്ടാകുകയും ചെയ്തു, ഈ കേടുകൊണ്ടാണ് വള്ളത്തിത് അലങ്കാരവും ഐശ്വര്യവുമായ ചെരിവ് ഉണ്ടായത് എന്ന് പറഞ്ഞ് കേൾക്കുന്നു, 1970  സെപ്റ്റംബർ 8  രാവിലെ 8 നും 9.15 നും ഇടയിലുള്ള ശുഭമുഹൂർത്തത്തിൽ വള്ളം നീരണിയുകയും ചെയ്തു. 
1970 പായിപ്പാട് ജലോൽസവത്തിൽ ആദ്യമായി പങ്കെടുത്തു.
1971 ൽ ചംങ്ങങ്കരി ബോട്ട് ക്ലബ് നെഹൃ ട്രോഫിയിൽ ആദ്യമായി തുഴഞ്ഞു .1972,73 ചംബക്കുളം ബോട്ട് ക്ലബ് തുഴയുകയും ഫൈനലിൽ പ്രവേശിക്കുകയും ചെയ്തു.അന്ന് അവർ കളിച്ചത് ചമ്പക്കുളം 2 എന്ന പേരിലാണ് രെജിസ്റ്റർ ചെയ്തത്,
73 ൽ വള്ളം തുഴഞ്ഞത് കുട്ടമംഗലം ബോട്ട് ക്ലബ്  ചമ്പക്കുളം I എന്ന പേരിൽ തുഴഞ്ഞ് വീണ്ടും ഫൈനലിസ്റ്റായി, അന്ന് കല്ലൂപ്പറൻ 5 മിനിറ്റ് 8 സെക്കന്റ് കൊണ്ട് വിന്നിക്കൊടി പാറിച്ചു( അന്ന് കല്ലൂപ്പ 
റമ്പനുമായി ട്രോഫി പങ്കുവെച്ചു എന്ന വാദം ഇപ്പോളും നിലനിൽക്കുന്നു)
1974ൽ FB C ചേന്നങ്കരി കാരിച്ചാൽ എന്ന പേരിൽ തന്നെ തുഴയുകയും തച്ചന് പേരും നാടിന് പെരുമയും നൽകിക്കൊണ്ട് ഇടത്തോട്ട് ചരിഞ്ഞ് കരിനാഗത്തെപ്പോലെ ചീറ്റി ഫിനീഷിംഗ് കടന്ന് തന്റെ ജൈത്രയാത്രയ്ക്ക് തുടക്കമിട്ടു.
1975 ൽ ലും PC ജോസഫ് വേണാട്ട്കാടിന്റെ ക്യാപ്റ്റൻസിയിൽ കാരിച്ചാൽ തന്റെ രണ്ടാം അംഗവും വിജയിച്ചു കയറുന്നു. എന്നാൽ ചില ഉള്ളു കളികൾ നടന്നതിനാൽ 1976 ൽ കാരിച്ചാൽ എന്ന കരിനാഗത്തെ അണിയിച്ച് ഒരുക്കി വന്നത് UBC കൈ നകരി ആയിരുന്നു, ആ വർഷം തന്റെ ആദ്യ ഹാട്രിക്ക് തികയ്ക്കുന്നു, 
അതിന് ശേഷം നീണ്ട മൂന്നു വര്ഷങ്ങൾ കാത്തിരുന്നു കാരി 1980 ൽ പുല്ലംകടി ബോട്ട് ക്ലബി ലൂടെ തന്റെ നാലാമത്തെ ജയം ആഘോഷിച്ചു'
1982,83,84 ൽ കുമരകം ബോട്ട് ക്ലമ്പിലൂടെ തന്റെ രണ്ടാം ഹാട്രിക്കും ഒരു വള്ളം ഒരു ടീം ഒരു ക്യാപ്റ്റൻ എന്ന നിലയിൽ ആദ്യത്തെ ഹാട്രിക്കും തന്റെ പേരിലാക്കി ജലചക്രവർത്തി തന്റെ അശ്വമേധം തുടർന്നു. ഈ കാലയളവിൽ പായിപ്പാട്ടു ജലോത്സവത്തിലും ഹാട്രിക് നേടി സീസണിൽ ഏറ്റവും കൂടുതൽ വിജയിച്ച വള്ളം എന്ന റെക്കോർഡും സ്വന്തം പേരിലാക്കി തന്റെ തേരോട്ടത്തിന് ആക്കം കൂട്ടി, 82,83 ൽ KK പങ്കജാക്ഷന്റെ ക്യാപറ്റൻസിയിൽ മൂലം കളിയിൽ ജയിക്കുകയും 84 ൽ ഹാട്രിക്കിനായി വന്നപ്പാൾ നാഗവള്ളി RS കുറുപ്പ് കമന്ററി പറഞ്ഞപ്പോൾ ഉപയോഗിച്ച വിശേഷണം " പാവം, പങ്കജാക്ഷൻ ക്യാപ്റ്റനായ വള്ളം വളരെ പിറകിൽ കടന്നു വരുന്നു" എന്നാണ്. പാവം എന്നു പറഞ്ഞത് വളളത്തെയായിരുന്നു; ക്യാപ്റ്റനെ അല്ല. പക്ഷെ കുട്ടനാട്ടുകാർ ആ വിശേഷണം ആ വലിയ വള്ളംകളി സംഘാടകന്റെ തലയിൽ വച്ചു കൊടുക്കുകയായിരുന്നു.
അദ്ദേഹം കഴിഞ്ഞ വർഷം അന്തരിച്ചു.
തുടർന്ന് 86,87 ൽ ശ്രീ സണ്ണി അക്കരക്കളത്തിന്റെ നേതൃത്വത്തിൽ വില്ലേജ് ബോട്ട് ക്ലബ് കൈനകരി യിലൂടെ വിജയിച്ച് തന്റെ പേർ തങ്കലിപികളിൽ എഴുതിച്ചേർത്തു.1988 ൽ തന്റെ ഹാട്രിക്ക് ചതിപ്രയോഗങ്ങൾ കാരണം നഷ്ടപ്പെട്ടു എന്ന് അവന്റ ഇഷ്ട ജനങ്ങൾ വിശ്വസിക്കുന്നു.
അതിന് ശേഷം പല നല്ല കളികൾ കാഴ്ചവെച്ച കിലും ശനിദോഷം കാരണമാണോ എന്ന് അറിയില്ല നീണ്ട ഒരു വ്യാഴവട്ടക്കാലം കാത്തിരിക്കേണ്ടി വന്നു കാരിക്കും തന്റെ നാട്ടുകാർക്കും, ഈ കാലമത്രയും അവനെ പൊന്നുപോലെ നോക്കിയ കമ്മറ്റിക്കാർക്കും നാട്ടുകാരേയും ഈ അവസരത്തിൽ നന്ദിയോടെ ഓർക്കുന്നു.
വീണ്ടും 2000 മാണ്ടിൽ ആലപ്പുഴ  ബോട്ട് ക്ലെമ്പിലൂടെ തന്റെ രണ്ടാം വരവ് ആഘോഷിച്ച കാരി
2001 ൽ FB C ചേന്നം കരിയുടെ ചുമലിലേറി തന്നെ കിരീടം നിലനിർത്തി,
2003 വീണ്ടും തമ്പി പൊടിപാറ ക്യാപ്റ്റനായി നവജീവൻ ബോട്ട് ക്ലെമ്പിലൂടെ തന്റെ നിറസാനിധ്യം ജലോത്സവ ലോകത്തിന് കാട്ടിക്കൊടുത്തു,
പിന്നീട് വള്ളംകളിയിൽ കാതലായ മാറ്റങ്ങൾ വരികയും പ്രഫഷണലിസം കടന്ന് വരികയും ചെയ്തു,
തുടർന്ന് 2008ൽ ജിജി ജേക്കബ് ക്യാപ്റ്റനായി ജീസസ്സ് ബോട്ട് ക്ലബിലൂടെ തന്റെ  38 ആം വയസിലും ബാല്യം മാറിയിട്ടില്ലന്ന് പുതു തലമുറക്കാർക്ക് കാണിച്ചു കൊടുത്തു.
പിന്നീട് 2016 ൽ ജയിസ് കുട്ടി ജേക്കമ്പിന്റെ ക്യാപ്റ്റൻസിയിൽ കരുത്തരും നവാഗതരുമായ K VB C യിലൂടെ കാരി എന്ന യാഗാശ്വം കുതിച്ചു പാഞ്ഞു കൊണ്ടിരിക്കുന്നു. 

കാരിച്ചാലിന്റെ ചെരിവ് നിവർത്തി കളിച്ചവർക്ക് ആർക്കും തന്നെ ജയിച്ചിട്ടില്ല എന്നത് സത്യമായി നിലകൊള്ളുന്നു.  നല്ല ടീമിനെ തിരഞ്ഞെടുക്കാനും അവരുടെ പാകത്തിൽ വള്ളം ഒരുക്കി കൊടുക്കാനും മൽസരിക്കുന്ന കമ്മറ്റിക്കാർ, വള്ളത്തിന്റെ തൂക്കം, ഒതുക്കം, വലിപ്പക്കുറവ് 80,85 പേരെ വച്ചു വള്ളം തുഴയുന്നതിൽ വരുന്ന ചിലവ്  കുറവ്, ഈശ്വരാധീനം, ഭാഗ്യം എന്ന എല്ലാ ഗുണങ്ങളും ഒത്തുചേർന്ന നമ്മുടെ കാരിച്ചാൽ ചുണ്ടൻ കാരിച്ചാൽ കരയുടെ പേര് സുമനസുകളിൽ എത്തിച്ച ജലചക്രവർത്തി 15 ആം ജയം | KTB C യിലൂടെ നേടി